The technological and industrial history of China is extremely varied, and extensive. China's industrial sector has shown great progress using most of its technology from the 1950s.

Overview 

By the mid-1980s, industrial reforms had achieved substantial success in some areas.
A wide range of modern industries had been established;
The country was one of the world's leading producers of coal, textiles, and bicycles. There were major plants in almost every key industry.
Light-industry output of consumer goods had increased dramatically. 
In some cases, enterprises reduced operating costs.
Managers were able to exercise greater autonomy and technical innovations were implemented to increase efficiency.

Major problems included: failure to reform pricing systems, interference of local cadres in manager's operation of enterprises, and perpetuation of the life tenure, "iron rice bowl" system for workers. Rapid industrial growth made energy shortages one of the most critical problems facing the economy, limiting industrial enterprises and mines to 70 or 80 percent of capacity.

In the 1980s large-scale, centrally controlled plants dominated manufacturing. These large plants were supplemented with many small-scale town and township enterprises, which accounted for significant percentages of national output of coal, construction materials, and leather products.

Organization 
The government managed industry according to type and level of control, using various State Council ministries and commissions. In 1987, there were separate ministries for aeronautics, astronautics, chemicals, coal, electronics, metallurgy, nuclear energy, ordnance, petroleum, and textiles industries, light industry, the railways, and water resources and electric power; there were two commissions – the National Defense Science, Technology, and Industry Commission and the State Machine-Building Industry Commission.

In 1986 the government recognized four types of economic enterprise ownership: "ownership by the whole people" (or state ownership), collective, individual, and other. Under state ownership the productive assets of an enterprise were owned by the state, activities of the enterprise were determined by national economic plans, and profits or losses accrued to the state budget. Most of the largest modern enterprises were state-owned and directly controlled by the central government. Many other enterprises also were state-owned but were jointly supervised by the central government and authorities at the provincial, prefectural, or county levels. Profits from these enterprises were divided among the central and lower-level units.

Under collective ownership, productive assets were owned by the workers themselves (in the case of an urban enterprise) or by the members of enterprises established by rural units. Profits and losses belonged to the members of the collective, and government authorities directed the enterprise loosely. Collectively owned enterprises were generally small and labor-intensive, employing approximately 27 million people in cities and towns in 1983. Individual ownership belonged to the category of individual handicrafts in the 1950s; by the mid-1980s it also included individual enterprises with a maximum of thirty employees. The Chinese authorities left the "other" category undefined.

Geographic distribution of industry 
Before 1949 industry was concentrated in the large east-coast cities and in the northeast. Shanghai was the largest industrial center, followed by Anshan, Fushun, and Shenyang, all in Liaoning. Qingdao, in Shandong, and Tianjin also were important industrial centers. Only a few cities in the interior had any modern industry; they included Wuhan, Chongqing, and Taiyuan.

During the First Five-Year Plan (1953–57), the government specifically emphasized development of the northeast and areas other than Shanghai, China's most important industrial base. Industrial sites were constructed in the north around the new steel mills at Baotou, Inner Mongolia, and in central China in Wuhan, Hubei. Industrial centers also arose in the southwest, mostly in Sichuan.

In the 1950s, industrial centers in east and northeast China accounted for approximately two-thirds of total industrial output. However, by 1983 industrial centers in the north, south, and southwest had increased their share of output to more than 40 percent. This increase was the result of a policy begun in the 1950s to gradually expand existing industrial bases to new areas, to build new bases in the north and south, and to establish a new base in the southwest.

From 1952 to 1983, south, southwest, and northwest China registered higher industrial growth than the east, northeast, and north regions. Total industrial output grew the fastest in the south – from 13.7 percent of total output in 1952 to 18.5 percent in 1983. The government had stressed developing the interior regions since the 1950s, but by 1986 it had abandoned that strategy in order to develop areas with more established infrastructures. According to this plan, the south would continue growing, but the east and northeast would be the main benefactors.

Level of technology 
Despite marked improvement over the early years of the People's Republic, the technological level of Chinese industry generally remained quite low in the late 1980s. The Chinese made remarkable technological progress in some areas, such as nuclear weaponry, satellites, and computers; but overall the industrial sector lagged far behind that of the developed countries. Much of China's machinery and equipment dated from the 1950s and 1960s. The Soviet Union had provided technology assistance during the 1950s, but such aid ended abruptly in the early 1960s with the break in bilateral relations (see Sino-Soviet split).

One of the main reasons for lagging technology was the lack of coordination between research institutes and production enterprises. Between 1979 and 1984, the number of major scientific and technical research discoveries grew from 2,790 to 10,000 and the number of inventions approved by the state from 42 to 264. Most of the discoveries and inventions were never implemented. This was mainly because research institutes and production enterprises operated independently, with little or no exchange of information. Also, most enterprise managers were more concerned with meeting production quotas than with technological innovations.

There were no clear goals for research and development, and no concept of the importance of research and development to industry. Instead, efforts concentrated on research and development for purely scientific purposes. Therefore, China did not develop a broad base of industrial research and development. By 1981 only 8 percent of the total research and development work force was involved in industrial research compared to 72 percent in the United States. In 1983 only 3.2 persons per 10,000 population were involved in research, compared to 31 per 10,000 in the United States. Institutional obstacles and resource shortages also plagued research institutes.

In 1985 the CPC issued the "Resolution on the Reform of the Science and Technology Management System." The resolution sought to coordinate research and production more closely. Part of the overall strategy of the Four Modernizations was to redirect science and technology toward economic progress. Research institutes were to compete for contracts from various industries and operate on a fee-for-service basis. Emphasis went to cooperation among factories, universities, and other institutes.

As of 1987, the status of this effort remained unclear. The metallurgical industry had applied more internal technological innovation than the electronics industry because the technologies in the former were more developed than in the latter. The metallurgy industry made a stronger effort to blend research and production in individual enterprises. Also, major metallurgical complexes had internal research facilities for new-product research. On the other hand, electronics was much more compartmentalized; by the late 1980s there was no decisive breaking of the barriers between the technical and production elements.

China's assimilation of imported technology had mixed results in the mid-1980s. There had been some remarkable accomplishments, but they had taken a long time. For example, advanced West German cold-rolling technology had moved into the Anshan iron and steel complex in Liaoning Province. The electronics sector was not as successful, because of shortages of raw materials, lack of a reliable power supply, low manpower skill, and a shortage of service and applications personnel. An exception was the Jiangnan Semiconductor Plant in Wuxi, Jiangsu, which received equipment from numerous Japanese and American companies. By 1987 it was highly productive. However, China's electronics industry, like most other industries, was at the time far from implementing advanced technology, whatever its source.

Supplies of industrial resources

Capital 
Since 1949 China has devoted a large percentage of investment to industry. By 1983 investment in industry was approximately 57 percent of investment in fixed assets. In 1984 about ¥44 billion, or roughly 30 percent of total state expenditures, was slated for capital construction. In 1981 the leadership attempted to limit uncontrolled, excessive investment in capital construction. The results were not especially positive – partly because of reinvestment by enterprises allowed to retain profits, and partly because of foreign investment.

To supplement domestic sources of capital, China's leadership began allowing virtually all forms of foreign loans and credit by the end of 1979. By early 1980, the country had access to the equivalent of almost US$30 billion in foreign loans and credits termed through 1985. China also sought foreign capital by encouraging joint-venture projects between Chinese and foreign enterprises. But, in early 1986, foreign companies viewed China as a high-cost and high-risk investment area. In 1985 US$8.5 billion worth of foreign capital had been committed, compared to only $US500 million in the first quarter of 1986.

Labor 
In the mid-1980s about 11 percent of the work force, or 50 million people, was employed by the industrial sector in state-owned enterprises, where the annual output per worker (the Chinese measure of productivity) rose by 9.4 percent to ¥15,349. In 1987 there was a severe urban unemployment problem, and a virtually unlimited supply of unskilled and semi-skilled labor. Skilled workers, engineers, scientists, technicians, and managerial personnel were in very short supply. During the Cultural Revolution, many specialists were forced to abandon their occupations, and most training and educational programs ceased during the 10-year hiatus in higher education from 1966 to 1976 (see Education in the People's Republic of China). This led to a shortage of skilled personnel that seriously hampered the industrial sector's implementation of imported modern technology and independent development of new management and production forms. In 1980 a modern management training center was established in Dalian, Liaoning, with the help of foreign experts. In 1987 many Dalian graduates found it difficult to use their newly acquired skills because managerial autonomy was lacking, and many cadres had a vested interest in maintaining the status quo. It was then unclear what effect students educated abroad were having on industry.

Raw materials 
China is well endowed with most of the important industrial ores, fuels, and other minerals. Only a few raw materials are not present in deposits large enough for domestic needs. Supplies of iron and coking coal, although of poor quality, are adequate. By the early to mid-1980s, China was a significant exporter of rare metals necessary for the aerospace and electronics industries. Nonetheless, China imported materials such as steel, pig iron, copper, and aluminum because of a large domestic demand, lack of exploitation and an inadequate transportation infrastructure.

Energy 
Although China was the fourth-largest world producer of fuel in 1985, energy shortages remained a major obstacle to industrial growth. Energy waste was considerable; to offset this, some energy prices increased and penalties for waste went into force.

Coal was the primary energy source, accounting in 1985 for more than 70 percent of total fuel consumption. Proven reserves were more than 700 billion tons, and estimated reserves were 3,000 billion tons. Onshore and offshore oil reserves in 1985 were around 5.3 billion tons, mostly untapped. China had the world's seventh-largest electric power generating capacity, but output still fell far short of demand. Total natural gas output for 1985 was 12.7 billion cubic meters, with 15 billion cubic meters the target by 1990. Natural gas and oil received equal weight in the Seventh Five-Year Plan.

Manufacturing industry 
China's manufacturing sector developed according to the principle of "walking on two legs," a policy of self-reliance introduced in the 1950s. In the 1980s one leg consisted of the state-funded and state-controlled large and medium-sized plants with the most qualified personnel and the most advanced equipment. The other leg was small-scale plants using inferior equipment and large amounts of local labor. Together, the two sectors produced a wide range of industrial products. In most cases the larger plants accounted for the bulk of production, but the smaller enterprises were increasing their share and producing a significant percentage of cement, fertilizers, and farm machinery.

Iron and steel 

Before 1949 the iron and steel industry was small and dispersed; the Japanese had built the only modern steel facility just after World War I at Anshan, Liaoning. Although Japan eventually built nine blast furnaces in Anshan, total steel output by all plants never exceeded one million tons annually. Much of the Japanese equipment was either damaged in the Chinese civil war or removed by the Soviets at the end of World War II.

Since the establishment of the People's Republic, considerable investment has gone consistently to expand steel output. However, steel production has been very sensitive to changes in economic policies and political climate. Steel output rose steadily in the 1950s when Soviet advisers helped establish the basis of the iron and steel industry, installing numerous Soviet-designed blast and open hearth furnaces. The Great Leap Forward (1958–60) saw great growth of primitive backyard furnaces producing poor-quality pig iron, numerous new, small, modern plants, overuse of large plants, and exaggerated production reports. In 1961 the industry broke down; nearly all small plants were closed, and output fell to less than half the amount reported for 1960. From 1960 to 1965, output gradually recovered with equipment repair and the purchase of basic oxygen furnaces from Austria and electric furnaces from Japan. Production fell in 1967 and 1968 during the Cultural Revolution, but it grew rapidly in the relative political stability from 1969 through the early 1970s. In the mid-1970s political upheaval retarded output, as did the catastrophic Tangshan earthquake of 1976. That event severely damaged the Tangshan steel plant and the Kailuan coal mines. The latter are a major source of coking coal. After 1976 output climbed steadily, reaching 34.5 million tons in 1979. Steel production for 1986 was fifty million tons.

Steel was viewed as the cornerstone or "key link" of both the Great Leap Forward and the Four Modernizations programs. But the post-Mao leadership was determined not to repeat the economically disastrous Great Leap policies: in 1979 it called for a period of readjustment and a cutback in steel investment. However, it had set a goal of producing 80 million tons of steel by 2000. Production targets were to be met by renovating and improving existing facilities, rather than building new ones. Improvements in existing plants reduced steel-industry energy consumption from 73.8 million tons of coal in 1978 to 69.1 million tons in 1983, and production increased by 26 percent. However, the Chinese realized they would need outside assistance to fully modernize their steel industry. They sought hardware, technology transfer, and managerial and planning assistance.

In 1987 China was the world's fifth-largest producer of iron and steel, but lagged far behind developed countries in production methods and quality. Most steel capacity was in open-hearth furnaces with basic oxygen furnaces, electric furnaces, and side-blown converters. Much of the iron and coking coal used in making steel was of low quality. Approximately 25 percent of the country's coal went for steel production in 1985. In 1985 capital construction, considered excessive by the Chinese, exacerbated existing shortages of rolled steel, and imports filled 25 percent of domestic demand.

The Ministry of Metallurgical Industry (now defunct) reported in 1985 that China had 13 plants capable of producing at least 1 million tons per year. Accounting for approximately 65 percent of total production, these mills were built mostly during the 1950s. The Anshan plant was the oldest and most productive of all, producing 7 million tons per year. The next largest was in Wuhan. It was constructed in the 1950s with Soviet aid. China began construction in 1978 on its first integrated steel complex, the Baoshan Iron and Steel Works in Shanghai, but the completion date moved from 1982 to 1985, and finally to 1988.

Besides the larger plants, about 800 smaller mills were dispersed throughout the country in 1985. They ranged from specialty mills producing 500,000 tons per year to very small operations under local jurisdiction or other ministries. Many of the smaller mills were legacies of the Great Leap Forward, when local authorities had hurriedly established their own steel-making facilities. In the mid-1980s the government hoped to phase out these inefficient plants in favor of larger, more productive plants.

In the late 1980s, it was apparent that steel output would remain insufficient to meet the needs of the Four Modernizations. During the period covered by the Seventh Five-Year Plan, imports were expected to average 41 percent of domestic output. Thin rolled sheets, used to make such items as vehicles, washing machines, and refrigerators, were in extremely short supply. In 1984 China had to import about half its steel sheet and about 80 percent of its steel plate. Production of tubes and pipes also was inadequate, and approximately 50 percent of all tubes had to be imported. The country was most proficient in the production of steel bars, but it still had to import an estimated 1.8 million tons of rods and bars in 1984. In 1985 China imported a record 15 million tons of steel, more than two-thirds of it from Japan.

Machine building 
The machinery industry has been a leading priority since the founding of the People's Republic. The industry expanded from a few small assembly and repair facilities before 1949 to a large, widely distributed machine-building sector producing many types of modern equipment. However, as of 1987 the overall level of technology was still relatively backward. In the late 1970s and early 1980s, China intended to use large-scale imports to modernize the machinery industry, but later decided that limiting imports to critical areas would be less costly. Ministry of Machine-Building Industry planned called for about 60 percent of the industry's products in 1990 to reach the technological level of the industrialized countries during the 1970s and 1980s. Products built to international standards received priority in allocation of funds, materials, and energy.

In 1987 the machinery industry was distributed throughout the country. Nearly all counties and towns had one or more machine factories. Major machinery centers were Shanghai, Tianjin, Shenyang, Beijing, Harbin, Changchun, Taiyuan, Luoyang, Wuhan, Chongqing, Chengdu, Xi'an, and Lanzhou.

The machinery industry was selected by the State Council to lead the way in management reform. China's leaders realized that the quality of machinery would determine the success of modernization in all areas of the economy. The industry's extreme compartmentalization (a legacy of the Maoist obsession with self-reliance) showed a lack of communication among departments or within regions. Skilled managers were also lacking.

Machine tools 
In 1986 about 120 major enterprises produced most of China's machine tools. Many of the large plants were in the east, north, and northeast, particularly in Beijing, Shanghai, Shenyang, Harbin, and Tianjin. In the early and mid-1980s, a number of agreements with foreign manufacturers aimed to help China upgrade its machine tool industry. The Shanghai Municipal Government also asked World Bank's assistance in preparing and financing a comprehensive modernization scheme for the Shanghai machine-tool industry.

Overall, the machine-tool industry was based on 1960s technology. Many of the tools had a service life of only five to seven years, compared with twelve to fifteen years in industrialized countries. The tools were generally unreliable and ill-suited for precision work because of outdated design, low quality purchased components, substandard manufacturing facilities, and a lack of production-management expertise.

Electric power equipment 
By the early 1970s, major generator production centers in Harbin, Shanghai, Beijing, and Deyang, had built both hydro and thermal generators as large as 300 megawatts. There also were numerous small and medium-sized plants producing generators in the 3.2 to 80-megawatt range. As of 1986, China manufactured condenser-type turbo-generating units with capacities of 6,000 to 300,000 kilowatts; back-pressure extraction generating units with capacities of 12,000 to 50,000 kilowatts, geothermal facilities with capacities of 1,000 to 3,000 kilowatts; and hydropower equipment consisting of generator equipment with an 18-million-kilowatt capacity. Deficiencies showed in power-generating equipment and transmission technology, and significant problems existed in direct-current transmission, particularly in converter technology. China continued to lack experience in design and production of high-volt-ampere transformers and circuit breakers.

Transportation equipment 
The automotive industry, which grew substantially after 1949, did not keep pace with the demands of modernization. In the early 1980s demand was still low. A surge in demand resulted in the production of 400,000 vehicles and the importation of another 300,000 vehicles through early 1985. In the second half of 1985, stringent administrative measures curtailed most imports, and in early 1986 domestic production was reduced to 13 percent of that in early 1985. One cause for this was a large surplus created by high production and importation levels in 1984 and 1985. Although 1986 production levels were considered a short-term slowdown, the targets of the Seventh Five-Year Plan (1986–90) were quite low.

China's investment in the railroad industry during the Seventh Five-Year Plan was higher than that for any previous five-year plan, with an 80-percent increase over the Sixth Five-Year Plan (1981–85). The country allocated ¥10 billion to manufacture and purchase locomotives, with the remainder going to repair and renewal of obsolete equipment. During the Seventh Five-Year Plan, the Ministry of Railways set a production goal of 5,000 locomotives, including over 800 electric and over 2,000 diesel locomotives. The ministry also planned to manufacture 110,000 freight and 10,000 passenger cars. Despite these ambitious domestic production targets, China had to rely heavily on imported technology to modernize its railroad fleet.

From 1961 to 1987, China's maritime fleet grew faster than that of any other country in the world. During that time, the merchant fleet tonnage increased by an average 13.6 percent per year. From 1982 to 1987, Chinese shipyards produced fifty-five ships, including bulk cargo vessels, freighters, tankers, container ships, partial container ships, and passenger-cargo vessels, with a total dead-weight tonnage of more than 700,000 million. At the end of 1985, about 17 percent of China's merchant fleet was built domestically.

In the late 1950s, China began developing its own aircraft, known as the Yun, or Y-series. China built 135 civil aircraft between 1981 and 1985 and was scheduled to build hundreds more during the Seventh Five-Year Plan. Civil aircraft and aircraft engines were produced in large plants located primarily in Shanghai, Xi'an, Harbin, and Shenyang. Medium-sized factories produced the necessary test equipment, components, avionics, and accessories. China hoped for eventual self-reliance in all aircraft production, but it still imported planes in 1987.

Metallurgical equipment 
Much equipment in the metallurgical industry was based on Japanese designs of the 1930s and Soviet designs of the 1950s. Two-thirds of the major equipment at Anshan, one of the largest plants in China, was built during the 1930s and 1950s. In general, major metallurgical equipment was more technologically advanced than instruments and control systems. Measuring and monitoring instruments, essential to quality control, were in short supply.

Most of the iron- and steel-making equipment in general use was domestically produced. This included blast furnaces based on Chinese improvements to old Soviet designs, ore-beneficiation plants, open-hearth furnaces, sideblown converters, electric furnaces, and a wide range of steel-finishing equipment. To achieve a higher technological level, various pieces of equipment were imported since China had not assimilated the technology necessary for domestic production. In most instances the industry imported only the main equipment, neglecting necessary control instruments and auxiliary technologies.

Electronics 

In 1987 China's electronics industry was about ten to fifteen years behind those of the industrialized nations. Key problems were the inability to transfer technology from research to production and continued reliance on hand labor. Also, impatience to reach Western standards sometimes proved counterproductive. For example, instead of buying a complex item such as a microprocessor abroad, China chose to develop its own, at great expense.

In 1985 the electronics industry consisted of approximately 2,400 enterprises, 100 research institutions, 4 institutes of higher learning, and 20 secondary vocational schools. The industry employed some 1.36 million people, including 130,000 technical personnel. Besides the approximately 2,000 types of electronic components and large-scale integrated circuits produced by the industry, it made 400 varieties of electronic machinery, including electronic computers, television broadcast transmitters and receivers, and radar and communications equipment. In the 1980s China made great strides in the production of consumer electronic products such as televisions, radios, and tape recorders.

Chemicals 
China's chemical industry evolved from a negligible base in 1949, grew substantially in the 1950s and early 1960s, and received major emphasis in the late 1960s and 1970s. In 1984 chemical products served primarily agriculture and light industry. The three main areas of chemical manufacturing are chemical fertilizers, basic chemicals, and organically synthesized products. Chemical fertilizer was consistently regarded as the key to increased agricultural output. The output of many chemical products rose steadily, sometimes dramatically, from 1978 to 1984.

Except for a few items, such as soda ash and synthetic rubber, the great majority of chemical products, including fertilizer, came from small factories. Small-scale plants could be built more quickly and inexpensively than large, modern plants and were designed to use low-quality local resources, such as small deposits of coal or natural gas. They also minimized demands on the overworked transportation system.

Larger and more modern fertilizer plants were located in every municipality, province, and autonomous region. In the early 1970s, China negotiated contracts with foreign firms for construction of thirteen large nitrogenous-fertilizer plants. By 1980 all thirteen plants had been completed, and ten were fully operational. From 1980 to 1984 many inefficient fertilizer plants were shut down, and by 1984 additional plants were being built with the most advanced equipment available. To capitalize on China's rich mineral resources, the new plants were being constructed close to coal, phosphate, and potassium deposits.

Compared with advanced countries, China's chemical fertilizers lacked phosphate and potassium, and contained too much nitrogen. To boost supplies of phosphate and potassium, China relied heavily on imports during the Sixth Five-Year Plan.

Basic chemical production grew rapidly after 1949. In 1983 production of sulfuric acid was approximately 8.7 million tons with major production centers in Nanjing and Luda, and large plants at many chemical-fertilizer complexes. Soda-ash output in 1984 was 1.88 million tons, with production concentrated near major sources of salt, such as large coastal cities, Sichuan and Qinghai, and Inner Mongolia. Production of caustic soda was scattered at large facilities in Dalian, Tianjin, Shanghai, Taiyuan, Shenyang, and Chongqing. In 1984 output of caustic soda was 2.22 million tons. Nitric acid and hydrochloric acid were produced in the northeast, in Shanghai, and in Tianjin.

The chemical industry's organic synthesis branch manufactured plastics, synthetic rubber, synthetic fibers, dyes, pharmaceuticals, and paint. Plastics, synthetic rubber, and synthetic fibers such as nylon were particularly important in the modernization drive because they were used to produce such basic consumer goods as footwear and clothing. From 1979 to 1983, plastics production grew from 793,000 to 1.1 million tons and chemical fibers from 326,300 to 540,000 tons. The major centers for organic synthesis included Shanghai, Jilin, Beijing, Tianjin, Taiyuan, Jinxi, and Guangzhou. The industry received large amounts of foreign machinery in the 1970s.

Building materials 

Large-scale capital construction dramatically increased the demand for building materials. Like the chemical fertilizer industry, cement production featured simultaneous development of small-scale plants and large, modern facilities. Widespread construction of small-scale cement plants began in 1958. By the mid-1970s, these plants existed in 80 percent of China's counties; in 1984 they accounted for a major share of national cement output. These local plants varied widely in size and technology. In 1983 China produced approximately 108 million tons of cement, second in the world to the Soviet Union. In 1984 production increased 14 percent, to 123 million tons and, except for Xizang and Ningxia autonomous regions, every province, autonomous region, and municipality had plants capable of producing 500,000 tons of cement per year.

China's building-materials industry developed rapidly and reached an output value of ¥28.7 billion in 1984. It manufactured over 500 types of products and employed approximately 3.8 million people in 1984. These materials were used in the metallurgy, machinery, electronics, aviation, and national-defense industries, and civil engineering projects. The main production centers for building materials were Beijing, Wuhan, and Harbin.

By the mid-1980s, China was one of the world's primary producers of plate glass, a critical building material. Production in 1984 reached 48.3 million cases, and twenty urban glass factories each produced 500,000 cases annually. Three large glass plants, each having a production capacity of 1.2 million standard cases, were scheduled for completion in 1985 in Luoyang, Qinhuangdao, and Nanning.

Paper 
In the early 1980s, China's serious shortage of productive forest combined with outdated technology to create a pulp-and-paper shortage at a time of increasing demand. From 1981 to 1986 the annual growth rate of paper production was 7.3 percent. However, in 1986 only 20 percent of paper pulp was made of wood; the remainder derived from grass fiber.

China's more than 1,500 paper mills, produced approximately 45.4 million tons and over 500 different types of machine-made paper in 1986. Approximately 1 million tons of pulp and paper were imported annually. In 1986 China focused on pollution control, increased product variety, less use of fiber and chemical ingredients, and more efficient use of energy as measures to improve production. However, China also sought foreign assistance to achieve these goals.

Textiles 
China has a long and rich history in production of silk, bast fiber, and cotton textiles. The earliest silk producer, China began exporting to West Asia and Europe around 20 BCE Ramie, a grass used to produce woven fabrics, fish lines, and fish nets, was first cultivated around 1000 BCE and is found in the southern provinces of Hunan, Hubei, Sichuan, Guangdong, and Guizhou, and Guangxi. Cotton spinning and weaving was the largest domestic industry in the late nineteenth and early twentieth centuries. After a respectable but inconsistent performance from 1949 to 1978, textile production increased significantly with the introduction of the agricultural responsibility system in 1979. By 1979 supplies of textiles had improved, the cloth-rationing system (in force since 1949) ended, and the industry began to flourish.

From 1979 to 1984, the output value of the textile industry rose approximately 13 percent annually. In 1984 China had about 12,000 enterprises producing cotton and woolen goods, silk, linen, chemical fibers, prints and dyed goods, knitwear, and textile machinery. Textile production was 15.4 percent of the country's total industrial output value in 1984. Textile exports in 1984 (excluding silk goods) totaled US$4.15 billion, up 21.7 percent over 1983, and accounted for 18.7 percent of the nation's total export value. By 1986 textiles had replaced oil as the top foreign-exchange source.

Traditionally, the coastal areas had the most modern textile equipment and facilities. Shanghai Municipality and Jiangsu Province were the nerve centers of the industry, accounting for 31.6 percent of the total gross-output value for textiles in 1983. Other major textile areas were Shandong, Liaoning, Hubei, Zhejiang, and Hebei provinces.

After 1949 cotton textile production was reorganized and expanded to meet consumer needs. Cotton cultivation increased in the areas around the established spinning centers in the port cities of Shanghai, Qingdao, Tianjin, and Guangzhou. New spinning and weaving facilities opened near the inland cotton-producing regions. In 1983 China produced 4.6 million tons of cotton, more than double the 1978 total.

China still was the world's largest silk producer in 1983, manufacturing approximately 1 billion meters of silk textiles. Shanghai Municipality and Jiangsu and Zhejiang provinces were the main silk centers. That year China also produced approximately 100,000 tons of knitting wool, 140 million meters of woolen piece goods, 3.3 million tons of yarn, and 541,000 tons of chemical fibers.

Food processing 
Food processing made significant advances in China after 1949. The most basic improvement was nearly universal establishment of mechanized grain-milling facilities in rural production units. The processing of food into finished and packaged products also grew extensively.

Although a growing number of food products were packaged for export, China's food processing capacity was relatively low in the mid-1980s. An immense variety of baked goods and candies was produced for local consumption, and most Chinese continued to resist processed foods. However, rising standards of living increased the demand for processed food because of its nutritional and hygienic advantages.

The beverage industry was very large and widespread. All regions had breweries and distilleries producing beer and a variety of domestic and western alcoholic beverages. China successfully exported several varieties of beer and liquor, and domestic soft drink production was widespread.

Other consumer goods 
In the first thirty years of the People's Republic, many basic consumer goods were scarce because of the emphasis on heavy industry. However, the 1979 economic reform program resulted in a consumer goods explosion. For example, television production increased from approximately 0.5 million sets in 1978 to over 10 million by 1984. During the same period, bicycle output increased about three and one-half times, production of electric fans increased twelvefold, and the output of radios doubled. In the first half of 1985, compared with the same period in 1984, production of television sets, washing machines, electric fans, and refrigerators increased dramatically. Refrigerators, washing machines, and televisions included imported components. In 1985 economic planners decided to limit production of refrigerators because they estimated that supply would outstrip demand by 5.9 million units in 1990. The following year, authorities curbed production of televisions because of excessive output and an emphasis on quality.

Construction

Housing construction 
Modern housing has been in chronic shortage in contemporary China. Housing conditions in 1949 were primitive and crowded, and massive population growth since then has placed great strains on the nation's building industry. According to 1985 estimates, 46 million additional units of housing, or about 2.4 billion square meters of floor space, would be needed by the year 2000 to house every urban family. Adequate housing was defined as an average of eight square meters of living space per capita. However, as of 1984, the average per capita living space was only 4.8 square meters. Housing specialists suggested that the housing construction and allocation system be reformed and that the eight-square-meter target be achieved in two stages: six square meters by 1990 and the additional two square meters between 1990 and 2000. To help relieve the situation, urban enterprises were increasing investment in housing for workers. In 1985 housing built by state and collective enterprises in cities and towns totaled 130 million square meters of floor space. In the countryside, housing built by farmers was 700 million square meters.

Capital construction 
Since the 1950s, the capital construction industry has been plagued by excessive growth and compartmentalization. There were frequent cost overruns and construction delays, and resources were overtaxed. Project directors often failed to predict accurately the need for such elements as transportation, raw materials, and energy. A large number of small factories were built, providing surplus capacity at the national level but with deficient economies of scale at the plant level. Poor cooperation among ministries and provinces resulted in unnecessary duplication. Because each area strove for self-sufficiency in all phases of construction, specialization suffered. Since the early years of the People's Republic, overinvestment in construction has been a persistent problem. Fiscal reforms in 1979 and 1980 exacerbated overinvestment by allowing local governments to keep a much greater percentage of the revenue from enterprises in their respective areas. Local governments could then use the retained earnings to invest in factories in their areas. These investments, falling outside the national economic plan, interfered with the central government's control of capital investment.

In 1981 the economy underwent a period of "readjustment," during which the investment budget for capital construction was sharply reduced. This administrative solution to overinvestment proved ineffective, and later reforms concentrated on economic measures such as tax levies to discourage investment. The issuance of interest-bearing loans instead of grants was also intended to control construction growth. Despite reforms, capital construction continued at a heated pace in 1986. The majority of the new investment was unplanned, coming from loans or enterprises' internal capital.

During the Seventh Five-Year Plan, 925 medium-and large-scale projects were scheduled. The government planned to allocate ¥1.3 trillion for fixed assets, an increase of 70 percent over the Sixth Five-Year Plan. Forty percent of the funds were allocated for new projects, and the remaining 60 percent for renovation or expansion of existing facilities. Some of the projects involved were power-generating stations, coal mines, railroads, ports, airports, and raw-material production centers.

Mining industry

Coal 

In the first half of the twentieth century, coal mining was more developed than most industries. Such major mines as Fushun, Datong, and Kailuan produced substantial quantities of coal for railroads, shipping, and industry. Expansion of coal mining was a major goal of the First Five-Year Plan. The state invested heavily in modern mining equipment and in the development of large, mechanized mines. The longwall mining technique was adopted widely, and output reached 130 million tons in 1957.

During the 1960s and 1970s, investment in large mines and modern equipment lagged, and production fell behind the industry's growth. Much of the output growth during this period came from small local mines. A temporary but serious production setback followed the July 1976 Tangshan earthquake, which severely damaged China's most important coal center, the Kailuan mines. It took two years for production at Kailuan to return to the 1975 level.

In 1987 coal was the country's most important source of primary energy, meeting over 70 percent of total energy demand. The 1984 production level was 789 million tons. More than two-thirds of deposits were bituminous, and a large part of the remainder was anthracite. Approximately 80 percent of the known coal deposits were in the north and northwest, but most of the mines were located in Heilongjiang and east China because of their proximity to the regions of highest demand.

Although China had one of the world's largest coal supplies, there still were shortages in areas of high demand, mainly because of an inadequate transportation infrastructure. The inability to transport domestic coal forced the Chinese to import Australian coal to south China in 1985. The industry also lacked modern equipment and technological expertise. Only 50 percent of tunnelling, extracting, loading, and conveying activities were mechanized, compared with the 95-percent mechanization level found in European nations.

Iron ore 
China had iron-ore reserves, totalling approximately 44 billion tons, in 1980. However, in the mid-1980s, China relied on imports because of domestic transportation and production problems. Sizable iron ore beds are distributed widely in about two-thirds of China's provinces and autonomous regions. The largest quantities are found in Liaoning Province, followed by Sichuan, Hebei, Shanxi, Anhui, Hubei, Gansu, Shandong, and Yunnan provinces and Inner Mongolia.

In the mid-1980s, mines lacked modern excavating, transportation, and ore-beneficiation equipment. Most of the ore mined had a low iron content and required substantial refining or beneficiation before use in blast furnaces. Most mines lacked modern plants for converting low-grade iron ore into concentrated pellets.

Energy industry

Oil 
Before 1949 China imported most of its oil. During the First Five-Year Plan it invested heavily in exploration and well development. In 1959 vast reserves were discovered in Songhua Jiang-Liao He basin in northeast China. The Daqing oil field in Heilongjiang became operational in 1960. Daqing was producing about 2.3 million tons of oil by 1963, and it continued to lead the industry through the 1970s. Further important discoveries, including the major oil fields of Shengli, in Shandong, and Dagang, in Tianjin, enabled China to meet domestic needs and eliminate nearly all imports by the mid-1960s. In 1973, despite a steadily growing internal demand for petroleum products, output was large enough to export 1 million tons of crude oil to Japan. Exports increased to 6.6 million tons in 1974 and reached 13.5 million tons in 1978. In 1985 exports of crude oil amounted to approximately twenty million tons, roughly 16 percent of total production. The majority of 1985 exports were to Japan, but the government also had released increasing quantities on the spot market and sent some to Singapore for refining. Although the government temporarily abandoned its drive to broaden its oil export base in 1986, 131 million tons of crude oil still were produced, an increase of 5.8 million tons over 1985.

Oil reserves are large and widely dispersed. In general, development is concentrated on deposits readily accessible from major industrial and population centers. Deposits in remote areas such as the Tarim, Junggar, and Qaidam basins, remain largely unexplored. The quality of oil from the major deposits varies considerably. A few deposits, like the Shengli field, produce low-quality oil suitable mainly as fuel. Most of the oil produced in China from the big fields in the north and northeast is heavy, low in sulfur, and has a very high paraffin content, making it difficult and expensive to extract and to refine.

Offshore exploration and drilling were first undertaken in the early 1970s, and it became more widespread and advanced as the decade progressed. Chinese and foreign oil experts believed that offshore deposits were extensive and could equal onshore reserves. Offshore operations relied heavily on foreign technology. In 1982 thirty-three foreign oil companies submitted bids for offshore drilling rights; twenty-seven eventually signed contracts. By the mid-1980s, when offshore exploration results were disappointing and only a handful of wells were actually producing oil, China began to emphasize onshore development. To continue offshore exploration, China established the China National Offshore Oil Corporation (CNOOC) to assist foreign oil companies in exploring, developing, extracting, and marketing China's oil.

Exploration and drilling was concentrated in areas in the South China Sea, Gulf of Tonkin, and Pearl River Mouth Basin in the south, and Bohai Bay in the north. Disputes between China and several neighboring countries complicated the future of oil development in several promising offshore locations.

Natural gas 
Natural gas was a relatively minor source of energy. Output grew rapidly in the 1960s and 1970s. By 1985 production was approximately 12 billion cubic meters – about 3 percent of China's primary energy supply. The following year, output increased by 13 billion cubic meters. Sichuan Province possesses about half of China's natural gas reserves and annual production. Most of the remaining natural gas is produced at the Daqing and Shengli northeastern oil fields. Other gas-producing areas include the coastal plain in Jiangsu, Shanghai, and Zhejiang; the Huabei complex in Hebei Province; and the Liaohe oil field in Liaoning Province.

The exact size of China's natural gas reserves was unknown. Estimates ranged from 129 billion to 24.4 trillion cubic meters. China hoped for a major discovery in the Zhongyuan Basin, a 5,180-square-kilometer area along the border of and Henan and Shandong provinces. Major offshore reserves have been discovered. The largest unexploited natural gas potential was believed to be in Qinghai and Xinjiang.

A rudimentary petroleum-refining industry was established with Soviet aid in the 1950s. In the 1960s and 1970s, this base was modernized and expanded, partially with European and Japanese equipment. In 1986 Chinese refineries were capable of processing about 2.1 million barrels a day. By 1990 China plans to reach 2.5 million barrels a day.

In the 1970s, China constructed oil pipelines and improved ports handling oil tankers. The first oil pipeline was laid from Daqing to the port of Qinhuangdao; 1,150 kilometers long, it became operational in 1974. The following year the pipeline was extended to Beijing; a second line connected Daqing to the port of Luda and branched off to the North Korea. A pipeline from Linyi in Shandong Province to Nanjing was completed in 1978, linking the oil fields of Shengli and Huabei to ports and refineries of the lower Yangtze River region. In 1986 plans had been made to construct a 105-kilometer pipeline linking an offshore well with the Chinese mainland via Hainan Islands.

Electric and nuclear power 
The leadership decided to build thermal power stations to meet the country's electricity needs, because such plants were relatively inexpensive and required construction lead-times of only three to six years. In 1985 approximately 68 percent of generating capacity was derived from thermal power, mostly coal-fired, and observers estimated that by 1990 its share would increase to 72 percent. The use of oil-fired plants peaked in the late 1970s, and by the mid-1980s most facilities had been converted back to coal. Only a few thermal plants were fueled by natural gas. Hydropower accounted for only about 30 percent of generating capacity. Observers expected that during the Seventh Five-Year Plan, China would continue to emphasize the development of thermal power over hydropower, because of the need to expand the power supply quickly to keep pace industrial growth. However, in the long term, hydropower gradually was to be given priority over thermal power.

In 1986 China's total generating capacity was 76,000 megawatts: 52,000 from thermal plants and 24,000 from hydropower sources. China planned to construct large generators with capacities of 100 to 300 megawatts to increase thermal power capacity. The new, larger generators would be much more efficient than generators with capacities of only 50 megawatts or less. With the larger generators, China would only have to increase coal consumption by 40 percent to achieve a 54-percent increase in generating capacity by 1990. Observers believed that as China increased its grid network it could construct power plants close to coal mines, then run power lines to the cities. This method would eliminate the costly and difficult transportation of coal to smaller urban plants, which had already created a significant pollution problem.

From 1949 to 1986, China built at least 25 large, 130 medium, and about 90,000 small-sized hydropower stations. According to the Ministry of Water Resources and Electric Power, China's 1983 annual power output was 351.4 billion kilowatt hours, of which 86 billion kilowatt hours were generated by hydropower. While construction of thermal plants was designed as a quick remedy for alleviating China's power shortages, the development of hydropower resources was considered a long-term solution. The primary areas for the construction of hydropower plants were the upper Yellow River, the upper and middle stream tributaries and trunk of the Yangtze River, and the Hongshui River in the upper region of the Pearl River Basin. The construction of new hydropower plants was a costly and lengthy process, undertaken with assistance from the United States, Canada, Kuwait, Austria, Norway, France, and Japan.

To augment its thermal and hydropower capacity, China was developing a nuclear energy capability. (See Nuclear power in China.) China's nuclear industry began in the 1950s with Soviet assistance. Until the early 1970s, it had primarily military applications. However, in August 1972, reportedly by directive of Premier Zhou Enlai, China began developing a reactor for civilian energy needs. After Mao Zedong's death in 1976, support for the development of nuclear power increased significantly. Contracts were signed to import two French-built plants, but economic retrenchment and the Three Mile Island incident in the United States abruptly halted the nuclear program. Following three years of "investigation and demonstration," the leadership decided to proceed with nuclear power development. By 1990 China intended to commit between 60 and 70 percent of its nuclear industry to the civilian sector. By 2000 China planned to have a nuclear generating capacity of 10,000 megawatts, accounting for approximately 5 percent of the country's total generating capacity.

In 1989 a 300-megawatt domestically designed nuclear power plant was constructed at Qinshan, Zhejiang. Although most of the equipment in the plant was domestic, a number of key components were imported. The Seventh Five-Year Plan called for constructing two additional 600- megawatt reactors at Qinshan. Another plant, with two 900 megawatt reactors, was constructed at Daya Bay in Guangdong. The Daya Bay Nuclear Power Plant was a joint venture with Hong Kong, with considerable foreign loans and expertise.

Communications industry 
Transportation, the postal system, and telecommunications employed over 12 million people in 1985. Long-distance transportation was carried primarily by railroads, inland waterways, and highways. The government-run railroad network was the backbone of the freight system, and rail lines extended to nearly all parts of China. In most areas, however, the rail system had too few feeder lines and was inadequately integrated. Much of the rail system had been improved in the 1980s; many heavily used stretches were converted to double track or upgraded, and several key new lines were constructed to relieve congested areas. Most locomotives in use in the early 1980s were picturesque but outdated steam engines. By 1987, however, several railroad districts had converted entirely to more modern and efficient diesel or electric locomotives, and domestic production of modern engines was supplemented by imported models. Within their limitations the railroads functioned fairly efficiently and made intensive use of the rail network. In 1986 the railroads carried 874.5 billion ton-kilometers of freight, 45 percent of the national freight total and a 7.8 percent increase over 1985. They also carried nearly 1.1 billion passengers, 20 percent of the national total. Despite reasonably good performance, the ability of the economy to move goods between cities and regions was severely limited by deficiencies in the system, and improvement of the railroads continued to be a high priority for state investment.

Inland navigation grew more quickly than the rail system and in 1986 carried 827.8 billion ton-kilometers of freight, nearly as much as the railroads. The principal inland waterway was the Yangtze River and its tributaries, which constituted the major artery linking the industrial and agricultural areas of central China and the southwest to the great port and industrial center of Shanghai. Improvements to the water routes enabled larger and faster modern vessels to use them, extended their navigable length, and reduced the amount of time they were closed each year. In addition to modern vessels, the lakes, rivers, and canals were plied by thousands of motorized and nonmotorized traditional craft of all sizes.

Local road networks were extensive, but many were narrow and unpaved, and all were overcrowded with trucks, jeeps, buses, carts pulled by tractors and animals, bicycles, pedestrians, and grain laid out to dry by local farmers. Owing to rapid increases in the volume of private and work unit trucking, highway freight traffic was the fastest growing major portion of the transportation system aside from ocean shipping. In 1986 highway freight traffic totaled 259.6 billion ton-kilometers, an increase of 47 percent over 1985, and 80 percent of the volume was carried by vehicles that were not managed by state highway departments. In 1986 buses served 4.3 billion passengers for relatively short trips.

Civil aviation provided important links both to isolated areas of the country and to foreign countries. It carried, however, only a small fraction of total freight and passenger traffic.

Service industry 
The service sector was a well-publicized goal of the reform program. Legalization of private and collective enterprise quickly led to the appearance of tinkers, cobblers, tailors, barbers, and small food-service stands, particularly in the free markets. Between 1978 and 1985, the number of people engaged in the service trades, retail sales, and catering grew from only 6.1 million to over 25 million, of whom 21 million were in collective or individual enterprises. In 1986 the government further stimulated the growth of the sector by leasing to private individuals or groups a large number of small, state-owned, service establishments, including restaurants, repair shops, and barber shops, that had consistently been operating at a loss under state management.

Other service sectors that employed significant quantities of labor included health care, education and culture, and government administration. These sectors were important to the national economy and employed over 25 million people.

China produced nearly all of its own medicines and medical equipment, but most hospitals were poorly equipped by Western standards. A more serious shortage was the relatively small number of doctors and other highly trained medical personnel. In 1985 some 4.3 million people worked in health-care institutions. Of these, 1.4 million were doctors – including 336,000 doctors of traditional (rather than modern) medicine, 637,000 were nurses, and 1.4 million were midwives, laboratory technicians, pharmacists, and other technical personnel. The number of doctors of modern medicine grew by over 35 percent between 1978 and 1985, and renewed contact with the West opened training opportunities in Europe, the United States, and Japan.

Only a little over 10 percent of all Chinese received free medical care. Free care was provided to government workers, military personnel, teachers, college students, and workers in state-owned enterprises. A portion of the medical expenses incurred by their dependent family members was covered by the work units. Most rural towns and villages operated voluntary cooperative medical systems (see Medicine in China).

Educational and cultural institutions employed 12.7 million people in 1985. This total included 871,000 teachers and staff in institutions of higher education, an increase of 68 percent over the number in 1978, reflecting the intensive reconstruction of the education system in the 1980s. There were nearly 8 million people working in government administration in 1985.

Rural industry
From 1980 to 1986, the number of rural town and township enterprises rose from 1.42 million to more than 12.2 million. There were five types of town and township enterprises: township enterprises, village enterprises, cooperative enterprises, enterprises jointly run by several households, and household enterprises. In 1986 the assets of the enterprises at the township and village levels totaled ¥134 billion.

Their total output value for 1985 was ¥272.8 billion, 17 percent of the gross national output and 44 percent of gross agricultural output. Rural enterprises absorbed a large portion of the surplus agricultural labor displaced by the agricultural responsibility system and the breakdown of the commune system. This absorption helped the state greatly by eliminating state support of millions of displaced workers. In 1986 rural enterprises employed approximately 76 million people, or 20 percent of China's total workforce.

The town and township enterprises made a significant contribution to overall economic growth. In 1985 an estimated 28 percent of coal, 53 percent of construction materials, 30 percent of paper, 20 percent of textile goods, 33 percent of garments, and 75 percent of leather products came from rural enterprises. The enterprises also made extensive progress in the export market, with 8,000 export-oriented factories, of which 870 were Chinese-foreign joint ventures. In 1985 town and township enterprises earned about ¥4 billion in foreign currency.

Despite the rapid growth and success of town and township enterprises, continued expansion faced obstacles in 1987. The government was trying to limit production because of economic and environmental concerns. Moreover, financial mismanagement, poor market analysis, rising energy and raw-material cost, substandard equipment, and constant interference from local government authorities hampered production and expansion. In certain areas, such as Zhejiang, efforts were made to solve some of the problems facing the rural enterprises. Local governments allowed the enterprises to keep 70 percent of profits, and of the remaining 30 percent remitted to the county government, 70 percent was invested in existing enterprises or used to establish new ones.

Defense industry 

China's defense-industrial complex produced weapons and equipment based predominantly on Soviet designs of the 1950s and 1960s. Because of a lack of foreign exchange, a low short-term threat perception, and an emphasis on the three other modernizations (agriculture, industry, and science and technology), China had decided to develop its defense industries gradually. It would rely primarily on domestic production, importing foreign technology only in areas of critical need.

The defense industries produced a wide range of military materiel. Large quantities of small arms and tanks were produced, and many were exported to Third World countries such as Iran. China had upgraded Soviet aircraft and was developing nuclear-powered ballistic-missile submarines, intercontinental ballistic missiles, and tanks equipped with infrared night-vision gear and laser rangefinders.

Because defense was assigned the lowest priority in the Four Modernizations in the 1970s, China's large defense sector has devoted an increasing amount of its resources to civilian production. For example, in the mid-1980s approximately one-third of the ordnance industry's output was allocated to civilian production, and the share was expected to rise to two-thirds by 1990. The defense sector produced a wide variety of products, ranging from furniture to telescopes, cameras to heavy machinery.

Despite the military's contribution to the industrial sector, in 1987 Chinese industry lagged far behind that of the industrialized nations. Much of industrial technology was severely outdated; severe energy shortages, transportation bottlenecks, and bureaucratic interference also hindered modernization. Although output was high in a number of industries, quality was often poor. However, China's industrial sector has made considerable progress since 1949. Output of most products has increased dramatically since the 1950s, and China now produces computers, satellites, and other high-technology items. The reform program introduced in the late 1970s brought an era of more rational economic planning and laid the groundwork for more balanced and sustained industrial growth. As of 1987, China's leaders were aware of the need for greater industrial efficiency and productivity, and were striving to achieve these goals.

See also
Economic history of China (1949–present)
Economy of China
History of agriculture in China
List of companies of China
List of countries by GDP sector composition
Technological and industrial history of the United States

References

 

Economic history of the People's Republic of China
History
China